The 442d Tactical Fighter Training Squadron is an inactive United States Air Force unit.   It was last assigned to the 474th Tactical Fighter Wing and stationed at Nellis Air Force Base, Nevada.

History
Established in 1943 as a P-47 Thunderbolt Replacement Training Squadron (RTU) under I Fighter Command.   Also performed air defense over New England.  Inactivated in 1944 with the end of RTU training.   Activated in 1956 under Tactical Air Command and programmed for F-100 Super Sabres.  Never manned or equipped, inactivated in early 1957.

Reactivated in 1969 as a General Dynamics F-111A training squadron, assigned to the 474th Tactical Fighter Wing.  It was inactivated in 1977 when the parent wing transferred its F-111 aircraft to the 366th TFW at Mountain Home AFB, Idaho.

Lineage
 Constituted 442d Fighter Squadron on 19 Feb 1943
 Activated on 24 Feb 1943
 Disbanded on 10 Apr 1944.
 Reconstituted, and redesignated 442d Fighter-Day Squadron, on 4 Oct 1956.
 Activated on 15 Oct 1956
 Inactivated on 8 Feb 1957
 Established and activated by Tactical Air Command as the 4527th Combat Crew Training Squadron on 20 January 1968
 Inactivated on 15 October 1969
 Re-designated as 442d Tactical Fighter Training Squadron on 1 October 1969
 Organized on 15 October 1969, assuming assets of TAC 4527th Combat Crew Training Squadron
 Inactivated on 31 July 1977

Assignments
 326th Fighter Group, 24 Feb 1943
 402d Fighter Group, 25 Nov 1943 – 10 Apr 1944
 402d Fighter-Day Group, 15 Oct 1956 – 8 Feb 1957
 474th Tactical Fighter Wing, 20 January 1968 – 31 July 1977

Stations
 Westover Field, Massachusetts, 24 Feb 1943
 Bedford Army Airfield, Massachusetts, 17 Sep 1943
 Hillsgrove Army Airfield, Rhode Island, 21 Nov 1943 – 10 Apr 1944
 Greenville AFB, Mississippi, 15 Oct 1956 – 8 Feb 1957
 Nellis AFB, Nevada, 20 January 1968 – 31 July 1977

Aircraft
 P-47 Thunderbolt, 1943-1944
 General Dynamics F-111A, 1968-1977

References

 Ravenstein, Charles A. (1984). Air Force Combat Wings Lineage and Honors Histories 1947–1977. Maxwell AFB, Alabama: Office of Air Force History. .

External links

Military units and formations in Nevada
Fighter squadrons of the United States Air Force
Military units and formations established in 1943